In geometry, a spherical wedge or ungula is a portion of a ball  bounded by two plane semidisks and a spherical lune (termed the wedge's base). The angle between the radii lying within the bounding semidisks is the dihedral . If  is a semidisk that forms a ball when completely revolved about the z-axis, revolving  only through a given  produces a spherical wedge of the same angle . Beman (2008) remarks that "a spherical wedge is to the sphere of which it is a part as the angle of the wedge is to a perigon."   A spherical wedge of  radians (180°) is called a hemisphere, while a spherical wedge of  radians (360°) constitutes a complete ball.

Hart (2009) states that the "volume of a spherical wedge is to the volume of the sphere as the number of degrees in the [angle of the wedge] is to 360".

See also 
Spherical cap
Spherical segment
Ungula

Notes 
A.  A distinction is sometimes drawn between the terms "sphere" and "ball", where a sphere is regarded as being merely the outer surface of a solid ball. It is common to use the terms interchangeably, as the commentaries of both Beman (2008) and Hart (2008) do.

References 

Spherical geometry